Cruel Jaws, also known as The Beast, is a 1995  direct-to-video Italian horror thriller film shot in Florida including the Theater of the Sea. The film stars Richard Dew and David Luther and was directed by Bruno Mattei (under the name of William Snyder). It was released on VHS and DVD in relative obscurity, mostly outside of the United States. While marketed in many areas as Jaws 5: Cruel Jaws, it actually doesn't have any connections to the Jaws franchise.

Plot

When a crashed military ship named the Cleveland crashes, two divers named Paco and Jose search it and are killed by a large tiger shark. The shark also kills their captain Ramone.

Meanwhile in Hampton Bay, Florida, aquarist Dag Soerenson, who runs the aquarium alongside his sons Bob and Larry, is trying to stop bigwig Samuel Lewis from shutting down the place due to months of unpaid rent. On the beach, one of the divers body is discovered and police chief Francis Berger and fish expert Bill Morrison bring it into autopsy where they determine that a large shark indeed attacked the diver, but Lewis and the Mayor Godfrey disagree and don’t bother to postpone the upcoming Regatta. One night, at Old Beach, a woman, Katie Adams, and her boyfriend Jan go swimming and Katie is killed by the shark. Berger tries to reason with the mayor but he still refuses.

A few shark proof gates are placed and the shark is apparently killed but Bill doesn’t agree. Even when Ramone’s broken boat shows up they still go on with the Regatta. The shark breaks through and kills many surfers. When it breaks the pier, it kills nearly everyone that falls in. It also causes Dag’s wheelchair-bound daughter Susy to fall in. Bill’s girlfriend Vanessa jumps in to safe her and is devoured. Lewis offers up a reward and is revealed to be working with the Mafia. His son Ronnie goes out and tries to kill it but is terrified of the shark which causes him to fall in and the shark eats him. His friends die by blowing up the boat by accident. Berger goes out to kill the shark but the shark is revealed to be too large to kill using the helicopter. The shark takes the helicopter out of the sky and devours Berger and the pilot. Bill explains that the Cleveland, that crashed in an area called Cape Farrows, was carrying the shark which was trained as top-secret navy material to attack the enemy. The Mafia boss sends two thugs out to kill the shark, but they go to Cape Farrows to explore the Cleveland when they steal Bill’s map to the wreck’s location. During this, they are both devoured.

Dag, Bill, Bob and Larry sail to the Cleveland where they load the wreck with dynamite and blow it up which kills the shark. Dag wins the reward which allows him to pay rent for the aquarium.

Production
Due to the low budget, the movie heavily utilizes footage from all 4 movies of the Jaws film series, as well as the Italian films Deep Blood (basically the entire climax of the movie) and Great White. In some airings (for example, in Germany), one scene even utilized the theme from Star Wars.

Cast
 Richard Dew as Dag Soerensen
 David Luther as Francis Berger
 George Barnes, Jr. as Samuel Lewis
 Scott Silveria as Bob Soerensen
 Kristen Urso as Susy Soerensen
 Sky Palma as Glenda
 Norma J. Nesheim as Vanessa
 Gregg Hood as Bill Morrison
 Carter Collins as Ronnie Lewis
 Natasha Etzer as Gloria Lewis
 Larry Zience as Larry 
 Jay Colligan as Tommy

Home media
The film was released on DVD in Europe in 2009. A Blu-ray release from Scream Factory was planned (packaged as a double feature with Exterminators of the Year 3000), but ultimately cancelled due to the film's unauthorized use of footage from the Jaws franchise and other shark movies. The film was officially released on Blu-ray and DVD in the US on September 29, 2020 by Severin Films.

See also
List of killer shark films

References

Other sources

External links

1995 films
1995 horror films
Films about sharks
Italian horror films
Natural horror films
1990s Italian-language films
Films directed by Bruno Mattei
Films set in Florida
Films about shark attacks
Films shot in Florida
Unofficial sequel films
Direct-to-video horror films
1995 direct-to-video films
1990s English-language films